Billy the Kid is a 1941 American Western film, a color remake of the 1930 film of the same name. The film features Robert Taylor as Billy and Brian Donlevy as a fictionalized version of Pat Garrett renamed "Jim Sherwood" in the film. Directed by David Miller and based on the book by Walter Noble Burns, the cast also included Gene Lockhart and Lon Chaney Jr. The film was not as well received as the 1930 original, Billy the Kid, which had starred Johnny Mack Brown and Wallace Beery and been shot in an experimental widescreen process.

Plot
The year is 1880 and William Bonney (Robert Taylor) is already a famous gunslinger, known as "Billy the Kid". In Lincoln, New Mexico, Billy helps his friend Pedro Gonzales (Frank Puglia) escape from jail, where he was put by mean sheriff Cass McAndrews (Cy Kendall).

Later, Billy and Pedro go back to a saloon from which Pedro was thrown out earlier by the locals because of his ethnicity. One of the cattle barons, Dan Hickey (Gene Lockhart), recognizes Billy and hires him to scare up some farmers into joining Hickey's business. Billy and the rest of Hickey's men start a stampede among the farmers' cattle, wreaking havoc and creating chaos. A farmer is killed during the stampede, and afterwards Billy feels guilty of what he has done.

During the stampede, Billy encounters one of his childhood friends, Jim Sherwood (Brian Donlevy), who works for a man named Eric Keating (Ian Hunter). Jim arranges for Billy and Pedro to come and work for the non-violent Keating instead of the violent Hickey.

At the Keating ranch, Billy meets Eric's beautiful sister Edith (Mary Howard) and is instantly attracted to her. He finds himself well at home at the ranch, until Pedro is shot in the back and killed by one of Hickey's men. Keating convinces Billy not to take revenge, but to wait until he has talked to the governor about the violent situation in the region.

However, Keating doesn't return from his visit to the governor. At Edith's birthday party, Keating's horse comes back with an empty saddle. Billy decides to go after Hickey and his men to seek justice. When Hickey finds out about Keating's men coming for him, he tries to make them change their minds by sending them a messenger who lies and tells them that Keating died while trying to get away from the sheriff. Keating's men doesn't buy the lie, so Hickey tries to stall them with negotiations, while sending for reinforcements.

After talking to Hickey, Jim seems to have switched sides, telling the sheriff to lock up Billy and another one of Keating's men, Tim Ward (Henry O'Neill). He says it's for their own protection, but Billy doesn't believe him.

Hickey tries to make the sheriff shoot Billy and say that he was trying to escape from jail, but Ward manages to disarm the sheriff, and later Billy kills him, thinking he is still trying to kill them.

Billy and Ward track down the men who killed Keating and shoots them one by one. When they are all dead, Jim and Hickey turns up. Jim tries to stop Billy from shooting Hickey, but when Hickey flees the scene Billy shoots him in the back.

The story ends with Billy challenging his old friend Jim, but he has shifted hands and is now using his right hand to draw instead of his usual quick left. Because of this, Jim is faster and kills Billy, and afterwards Jim realizes that Billy shifted hands deliberately and let him win.

Music
Ormond B. Ruthven and Albert Mannheimer wrote the song "Viva La Vida" for the film.

Cast
Robert Taylor as Billy the Kid
Brian Donlevy as Jim Sherwood
Ian Hunter as Eric Keating
Mary Howard as Edith Keating
Gene Lockhart as Dan Hickey
Lon Chaney Jr. as 'Spike' Hudson
Henry O'Neill as Tim Ward
Guinn Williams as Ed Bronson
Cy Kendall as Cass McAndrews, sheriff
Ted Adams as "Buz" Cobb
Frank Conlan as Judge Blake
Frank Puglia as Pedro Gonzales

Production
Parts of the film were shot in Monument Valley.

Both Taylor and Donlevy were ten years older than the real Billy and Pat were in 1880, the year the film begins.

Box office
According to MGM records the film earned $1,518,000 in the US and Canada and $914,000 elsewhere resulting in a profit of $41,000.

See also

Billy the Kid (1989 film)

References

External links

1941 films
Remakes of American films
Biographical films about Billy the Kid
Cultural depictions of Pat Garrett
1940s English-language films
Metro-Goldwyn-Mayer films
1941 Western (genre) films
Films directed by David Miller
Films set in 1880
Films set in New Mexico
Films shot in Utah
American Western (genre) films
1941 drama films
1940s American films